The Actor is a Canadian short documentary film, directed by John Paskievich and released in 1990. The film is a portrait of Ken D'Cruz, a Winnipeg man of Indian heritage whose aspirations to be an actor were dashed by racism, and who is now working as a portrait photographer.

The film was a Genie Award nominee for Best Short Documentary at the 12th Genie Awards in 1991.

References

External links

1990 films
1990 documentary films
Canadian short documentary films
English-language Canadian films
1990s Canadian films
Documentary films about photographers